Tobias Nilsson (born 20 February 1986) is a Swedish footballer who plays for Örebro Syrianska IF as a midfielder.

Career
Nilsson started out playing for his hometown club Onslunda IF before he got picked up by Malmö FF as a youth player. In 2005, he was moved up to the senior squad but never made any league appearances for the first team. During that time he also played with the Sweden national under-19 football team in their qualification games for the 2005 UEFA European Under-19 Football Championship.

After a loan spell with fourth tier club Lunds BK in 2006 he left Malmö FF the following year and joined second tier Superettan side Falkenbergs FF. There he played regularly for five seasons and became the best assist maker in the 2011 Superettan. This made newly promoted Allsvenskan club Åtvidabergs FF sign him for the 2012 season.

After the season had finished Nilsson told the club that he wanted more playing time and when Superettan club Örebro SK made a bid for the midfielder he decided to sign with them in January 2013.

References

External links
 
 Eliteprospects profile

1986 births
Malmö FF players
Åtvidabergs FF players
Allsvenskan players
Superettan players
Swedish footballers
Living people
Association football midfielders